Ōōkala (also spelled Ookala) is an unincorporated community on the island of Hawaii in Hawaii County, Hawaii, United States.  It lies along Hawaii Route 19 north of Hilo, the county seat of Hawaii County.  Its elevation is 371 feet (113 m), and it is located at  (20.0175000, -155.2872222).  Because the community has borne multiple names, the Board on Geographic Names officially designated it "Ōōkala" in 2000.  It has a post office with the ZIP code 96774.

The community was in the news after the Hawaii Department of Health warned that the gulch near the community had contaminated water. This was the result of waste from a nearby dairy draining into the water.  More recently the company, Big Island Dairy, has agreed to cease operations, to pay a fine and to remediate environmental concerns to prevent future waste water releases into nearby gulches by June 2019.

References

Unincorporated communities in Hawaii County, Hawaii
Populated places on Hawaii (island)
Unincorporated communities in Hawaii